Rony Khawam (born 8 September 1964) is a Lebanese judoka. He competed at the 1984 Summer Olympics and the 1988 Summer Olympics.

References

1964 births
Living people
Lebanese male judoka
Olympic judoka of Lebanon
Judoka at the 1984 Summer Olympics
Judoka at the 1988 Summer Olympics
Place of birth missing (living people)